Milajerd (also Romanized as Mīlājerd; also known as Melājerd and Mīlājīrd) is a city and capital of Milajerd District, in Komijan County, Markazi Province, Iran.

The 14th-century author Hamdallah Mustawfi listed Milajerd as one of the main villages in the Sharahin district under Hamadan.

References

Populated places in Komijan County

Cities in Markazi Province